The Idrisiyya is a Sufi order which was founded by Ahmad Ibn Idris al-Fasi (1760–1837). It was originally called the Tariqa Muhammadiyya. This was not a Tariqa in the sense of an organized Sufi order, but rather a spiritual method, consisting of a set of teachings and litanies, aimed at nurturing the spiritual link between the disciple and Muhammad directly.

Originally based in Mecca, this tariqa was widely spread in Libya, Egypt, Sudan, East Africa (Somalia, Eritrea, Kenya), Yemen, the Levant (Syria and Lebanon) and South East Asia (Malaysia, Singapore, Brunei). It also has followers elsewhere, through its different branches, such as Italy and the United Kingdom. The litanies and prayers of Ibn Idris in particular gained universal admiration among Sufi orders and has been incorporated into the litanies and collections of many paths unrelated to Ibn Idris.

A branch of this order was introduced in Singapore by the followers of Shaikh Muhammad Said al-Linggi (d.1926).
Idrisiyya was introduced in Pakistan by Shaikh Hafiz Muhammad Amin bin Abdul Rehman (b.1941).

Ahmad bin Idris had spiritual teachers in the Shadhili Sufi order and others. Although the Idrisiyya was based on a direct spiritual relationship with Muhammad, it was historically linked to the Shadhili order, as well as the Khadiriyya path of Shaykh Abd al-Aziz al-Dabbagh (d. 1719).

Among the descendants of this tariqa are the Sanusiyya, Khatmiyya (also known as Mirghaniyya), the Somali branches (Ahmadiyya, Dandarāwiyya, Salihiyya), and Ja'fariyya.

References

Bibliography

 O'Fahey, Rex S. (1994) Enigmatic Saint, Ahmad Ibn Idris and the Idrisi Tradition, Northwestern University Press, Evanston, Illinois by arrangement with C. Hurst and Co. (Publishers) Ltd., London. 
 Thomassen, Einar & Radtke, Bernd, (eds.) (1993) The Letters of Ahmad ibn Idris. London: Christopher Hurst. A collective volume containing the texts and translations of 35 letters to and from Ibn Idris. The contributors are Albrecht Hofheinz, Ali Salih Karrar, R.S. O’Fahey, B. Radtke & Einar Thomassen. Published by Northwestern University Press, Evanston, Illinois by arrangement with C. Hurst and Co. (Publishers) Ltd., London. 
 Sedgwick, Mark, Saints and Sons: The Making and Remaking of the Rashidi Ahmadi Sufi Order, 1799-2000, Leiden: Brill, 2005.
 Hidigh, Uthman, Anīs al-jalīs fī tarjamat sayyidī Ahmad ibn Idrīs, Mogadishu, n.d., pp. 112–124.
 Dajani, Samer, Reassurance for the Seeker: A Biography and Translation of Salih al-Ja'fari's al-Fawa'id al-Ja'fariyya, a Commentary on Forty Prophetic Traditions, Louisville, KY: Fons Vitae, 2013.
 http://beneficialilm.com/the-path/

Sunni Sufi orders